Tony Dawe (born 1940) is a British sound engineer. He has been nominated for four Academy Awards in the category Best Sound. Since 1958, he has worked on 70 feature films, 18 films made for television, and 340 hours of television drama. Before joining the film industry in 1967, he worked as an engineer at the famous EMI Abbey Road recording studios in 1958/60. Between 1960 and 1967, he worked for ABC Television at their Teddington studios, where he was in charge of the sound dubbing suite.

Selected filmography
 Oliver! (1968)
 Return of the Jedi (1983)
 Empire of the Sun (1987)
 Who Framed Roger Rabbit (1988)
 Indiana Jones and the Last Crusade (1989)

References

External links

1940 births
Living people
British audio engineers
Best Sound BAFTA Award winners